The Norman donkey, is a breed of domestic donkey from Normandy, in north-west France. It is found mainly in the present-day Lower Normandy and Upper Normandy regions, and is also present in Brittany and the Pays de Loire. It is the smallest of the seven recognised French donkey breeds. It was formerly used as a pack animal in agricultural work, mainly for carrying milk churns; it is now used in leisure sports and tourism. The breed was recognised by the Ministère de l'Agriculture, the French ministry of agriculture, in 1997. The stud book is kept by the Association de l'Âne Normand, an association of breeders.

History 

The breed originated in the three départements of what is now Lower Normandy, the Calvados, the Manche and the Orne; in 1970 there were 8500 donkeys of all breeds in that area. The Norman donkey was recognised by the Ministère de l'Agriculture on 20 August 1997. In 1998 a total of 225 Norman donkeys had been identified; the total number is now 1450.

Characteristics 

The Norman donkey measures . The coat may be bay in all its shades, chocolate brown or black pangaré, with a darker dorsal stripe and shoulder-stripe; the legs often show zebra-striping. The surround of the eyes and lower part of the muzzle are grey-white, as is the belly.

Use 
Like the Cotentin donkey, the Norman donkey was used in the 19th century as a pack animal to transport market garden produce, or take hay to livestock at pasture, or to carry milk-churns in a time when cows were milked by hand in the field; often the milkmaid or triolette sat on top of the churns. It was also used in harness, sometimes to pull a large wheeled churn, a godaine.
 
Today it may be used as a pack animal for hiking or trekking.

References 

Donkey breeds
Donkey breeds originating in France
Normandy